Frederick Wilkinson Hall (18 November 1917 – 8 January 1989) was an English footballer who played for Sunderland as a defender.

Club career
Hall arrived at Sunderland from Blackburn Rovers in 1946, and made his debut for the club on 31 August 1946 against Derby County in a 3–2 at Roker Park. Shortly after joining he was appointed as captain, as a central figure in the team. While playing for Sunderland during 1946 to 1954 he scored a single goal in 215 league appearances. After his Sunderland career, he joined Barrow in 1955 and went on to make 16 appearances with one goal in a single season, he then retired in 1956.

References

1917 births
English footballers
Blackburn Rovers F.C. players
Sunderland A.F.C. players
Barrow A.F.C. players
1989 deaths
Sportspeople from Chester-le-Street
Footballers from County Durham
Association football central defenders
English Football League players